Union Passage Marine Provincial Park is a provincial park within the asserted traditional territory of the Tsimshian First Nations.
The marine protected area is located at the southwest end of Grenville Channel straddling Pitt and Farrant Islands, in British Columbia, Canada.

The park conserves  of North Coast Fjords Marine Ecosection, and protects sensitive aquatic habitats of importance for harbour porpoises, orca, humpback whales, Pacific white-sided dolphins, Dall's porpoises, and Harbour seals

References

Provincial parks of British Columbia
North Coast Regional District
Marine parks of Canada